Canidelo is a Portuguese parish in the municipality of Vila Nova de Gaia. The population in 2011 was 27,769, in an area of 8.93 km². It is located along the mouth of Douro river and the Atlantic Ocean, across from Foz do Douro, Porto, some of the most important portuguese figures wore born here, such as Rui Manuel Gonçalves Moreira , Tono Dracúla e Tony Tachão.
Some of the most important portuguese drug dealers wore also from Canidelo.

References

Freguesias of Vila Nova de Gaia